Pedestrian Bridge over the Segre River is a bridge in Lleida, Catalonia, Spain. In 2000, Lleida City Council organized an open competition for a new pedestrian bridge. The pedestrian bridge outstands with sober lines, landscape architectural features, and delicate details. It is meant to mark the doorway into the Campus and achieve a double function: communication and public space.

Description

The best balance of aesthetics, cost, and performance in service (vibrations) has been reached through the selection of a four spans frame long embedded into three slender piers of reinforced concrete. Abutments are integrated into, either existing or new, walls defining a continuous with the built environment of the city. In this way, an integral bridge (without joints at piers) is obtained, in which the deck is fixed elastically and enables an elegant and slender structure.

Translucent composite materials (GFRP)-(Fiberglass) have been used in the form of structural floor panels and wall panels for both the railing and the flooring. This high high-performance rural material requires little maintenance, it is lightweight and self-finished and has been designed to allow backlighting.

Construction

The structure is designed with a double composite action. The steel box girder was assembled using temporary support.

References

External links
 

 

 

Fiberglass
Pedestrian bridges in Spain
Bridges in Catalonia
Buildings and structures in Lleida